Simon Simonis (born 23 July 1966) is a Cypriot archer. He competed in the men's individual event at the 1992 Summer Olympics.

References

External links
 

1966 births
Living people
Cypriot male archers
Olympic archers of Cyprus
Archers at the 1992 Summer Olympics
Place of birth missing (living people)